Dried apricots are a type of traditional dried fruit. When treated with sulfur dioxide (SO₂), the color is vivid orange. Organic fruit not treated with sulfur vapor is darker in color and has a coarser texture. Generally, the lighter the color, the higher the SO2 content.

Apricots have been cultivated in Central Asia since antiquity, and dried ones were an important commodity on the Silk Road. They could be transported over huge distances due to their long shelf life. Before the 20th century, they were ubiquitous in the Ottoman, Persian, and Russian Empires. In more recent times, California was the largest producer, before being overtaken by Turkey, where about 95% of the production is provided by the Malatya Province.

Small apricots are normally dried whole. Larger varieties are dried in halves, without the kernel or stone. In the former Soviet Union, the former are known as uryuk (урюк), used primarily for making kompots, and the latter as kuraga (курага).  Mediterranean or Turkish varieties of dried apricots are typically dried whole and then pitted; whereas California varieties are halved and pitted before drying. Ethnic foods based on dried apricots include qubani ka meetha in India and chamoy in Mexico.

Dried apricots are an important source of carotenoids (vitamin A) and potassium. Due to their high fiber-to-volume ratio, they are sometimes used to relieve constipation or induce diarrhea. Dried apricots normally do not have any sugar added and have a low glycemic index. The maximum moisture rate allowed in Turkey is 25%.

See also
 List of dried foods

References

External links
 

Apricot
Apricots
Kyrgyz cuisine